Viișoara is a commune in Mureș County, Transylvania, Romania that is composed of three villages: Ormeniș (Irmesch; Szászörményes), Sântioana (Johannisdorf; Szászszentiván) and Viișoara. It has a population of 1,663: 70% Romanians, 25% Gypsy, 3% Hungarians and 2% Germans.

References

Communes in Mureș County
Localities in Transylvania